The 1978 Kansas City Chiefs season was the franchise's 9th season in the National Football League, the 16th as the Kansas City Chiefs, and the 19th overall. It began with the hiring of new head coach Marv Levy, formerly of the Canadian Football League's Montreal Alouettes. With the NFL expanding its schedule to 16 games, the Chiefs finished with a 4–12 record and 5th in the AFC West.

Coach Levy's systematic restocking of a relatively barren defensive roster began with a 1978 draft class that included a pair of future Chiefs franchise hall of famers in defensive end Art Still and linebacker Gary Spani. Running back Ed Podolak, who was the club's all-time leading rusher at the time, retired in the offseason on June 15.

Perhaps Levy's most unconventional tactic in rebuilding the Chiefs was installing the Wing-T offense. "It was a situation where we took over a team that had the worst defensive record in the history of the National Football League," Levy explained. "We wanted to keep that defense off the field, so we ran the ball 60 times a game." The 1978 Chiefs team ran and ran often, posting franchise records with 663 rushing attempts and 2,986 ground yards. Levy's squad ran the ball a staggering 69 times in a 24–23 Opening Day win at Cincinnati on September 3, the most rushing attempts in an NFL contest since 1948. Five different players had 100-yard rushing games during the year, including running back Tony Reed, who finished the season with 1,053 yards to become the team's first 1,000-yard back since 1967.  Despite the squad's Opening Day success, the club lost 10 of its next 11 games, including a pair of overtime decisions. However, the team showed signs of improvement with the defense recording a 23–0 shutout against San Diego on November 26 as the club concluded its first 16-game schedule with a 4–12 mark.

Offseason

NFL Draft

Roster

Schedule

Preseason

Regular season

Game summaries

Week 1: at Cincinnati Bengals

Week 2: vs Houston Oilers

Week 3: at New York Giants

Week 4: vs. Denver Broncos

Week 5: at Buffalo Bills

Week 6: vs. Tampa Bay Buccaneers

Week 7: at Oakland Raiders

Week 8: vs. Cleveland Browns

Week 9: at Pittsburgh Steelers

Week 10: vs Oakland Raiders

Week 11: at San Diego Chargers

Week 12: vs. Seattle Seahawks

Week 13: vs. San Diego Chargers

Week 14: vs. Buffalo Bills

Week 15: at Denver Broncos

Week 16: at Seattle Seahawks

Standings

References 

Kansas City Chiefs
Kansas City Chiefs seasons
Kansas